A water horse (or "waterhorse" in some folklore) is a mythical creature, such as the , , the  and kelpie.

Name origin

The term "water horse" was originally a name given to the kelpie, a creature similar to the hippocamp, which has the head, neck and mane of a normal horse, front legs like a horse, webbed feet, and a long, two-lobed, whale-like tail. The term has also been used as a nickname for lake monsters, particularly Ogopogo and Nessie. The name "kelpie" has often been a nickname for many other Scottish lake monsters, such as each uisge and Morag of Loch Morar and Lizzie of Loch Lochy. Other names for these sea monsters include "seahorse" (not referring to the seahorse fish) and "hippocampus" (which is the genus name for seahorses).

The usage of "water horse" or "kelpie" can often be a source of confusion; some consider the two terms to be synonymous, while others distinguish the water horse as a denizen of lochs and the kelpie of turbulent water such as rivers, fords, and waterfalls. Some authors call one creature of a certain place a kelpie while others call it a water horse. The name "water bull" has been used for either creature.

The Breton King Gradlon's magical "horse of the sea" Morvarc'h (whose name literally means "sea horse" in Breton) was said to have the ability to gallop upon the waves of the sea, in a similar fashion to the water horses of Cornish legend.

Other lake monsters
The water horse has often become a basic description of other lake monsters such as the Canadian Lake Okanagan monster Ogopogo and the Lake Champlain monster Champ. Loch Morar is reputedly home to "Morag", a lake monster that has been portrayed as a water horse.

Settings
Whilst most Scottish/Celtic folklore places the water horse in a loch (particularly a loch that is famous for a lake monster, such as Loch Ness, Loch Morar or Loch Lomond), some Breton and Cornish tales of water horses place them in the ocean, making them sea monsters.

Most Highland loch have some kind of water-horse tradition, although a study of 19th-century literature of the time showed that only about sixty lochs and lochans merited a mention out of the thousands of bodies of water in Scotland. The water horse that was reputed to inhabit Loch Ness gained the most mentions in Highland literature.

Sightings
Water horse sightings were reported regularly during the 18th century, but it was not until the 19th century that sightings were recorded.
 In 1846 Captain Christmas of the Danish Navy reported sighting "an enormous, long-necked beast pursuing a school of dolphins" somewhere between Iceland and the Faroe Islands. He described the creature as having a horse-like head and a neck as thick as a man's waist "moving gracefully like a swan's".
 On 6 August 1848 an officer of the Royal Navy corvette HMS Daedalus noticed an unusual looking animal swimming towards the ship. It was said to look similar to a sea serpent with a  neck. It was reported to have no visible fins/flippers or tail, and it had what appeared to be a horsy mane on its neck with seaweed washed over its back.
 In late 1883, two horse-headed beasts, one of them smaller than the other (suggesting or implying a juvenile), were reported off the southern coast of Panama. The crew of the American whaler Hope On reported seeing a  creature submerge. It was brownish coloured with black speckles and four legs/flippers with a tail "that seemed to be divided into two parts" (implying the whale-like tail appearance) and all four limbs and tail were exposed when it reached the surface. A second creature that looked just like it only much smaller tagged along behind it. In the same year, a sighting of a similar looking creature occurred in the Bristol Channel. This creature was reported as leaving behind a greasy slug/snail-like trail.

See also
 List of fictional horses
 Each-uisge
 Hippocampus (mythology)
 Kappa (folklore)
 Neck (water spirit)
 Nuckelavee
 Peg Powler
 Selkie
 Vodyanoi

References

Citations

Bibliography

Celtic legendary creatures
Scandinavian legendary creatures
Horses in mythology
Water spirits